Anatole Vasilyevich Kuragin is a fictional character in Leo Tolstoy's 1869 novel War and Peace, its various cinematic adaptations, and an operatic adaptation as well.

Description 
Anatole is Hélène Kuragina's wild-living brother and a soldier, although he is rarely seen out of Russia in the book. It is rumoured that he has had an incestuous affair with his sister, and he tries to elope with Natasha Rostova despite being secretly married to a Polish woman during his time in the army. Later in the book, he gets his leg amputated at the Battle of Borodino, where he is treated next to Andrei Bolkonsky, Rostova's former betrothed.

Development
While developing the novel, Tolstoy sketched a character named "Petr", "who passed through a complex evolution" and "was a precursor of both Pierre and Anatole Kuragin". Anatoly Shostak served as the real life inspiration for the fictional Anatole.

Reception
Esther Polianowsky Salaman writes that what "is so interesting about Anatole Kuragin are the many characteristics Tolstoy gives us about him all at once: something he seldom does".

Screen & Stage portrayals
Anatole is played in the 1956 American film by Vittorio Gassman; in the 1966-67 Soviet film, by Vasili Lanovoy; in the 1972-73 BBC miniseries, by Colin Baker.  In the 2007 version, he is portrayed by German actor Ken Duken, and in the 2016 BBC series by Callum Turner. He was also portrayed by Lucas Steele, in the musical Natasha, Pierre & The Great Comet of 1812.

See also
List of characters in War and Peace

References

External links
"Anatole Kuragin (Character) from War and Peace (1956)," The Internet Movie Database
"Anatol Kuragin (Character) from Voyna i mir (1967)," The Internet Movie Database

Characters in War and Peace
Fictional soldiers
Fictional Russian people in literature
Male characters in literature
Literary characters introduced in 1869